William Stewart Berrehsem was a professional American football player for the Columbus Tigers. He attended Linsly Military Institute and Washington & Jefferson College.  He then attended United States Naval Academy.  He died in 1968.

See also

 List of Columbus Tigers players
 Washington & Jefferson Presidents football

Notes

References
 

1903 births
1968 deaths
Columbus Tigers players
Linsly School alumni
Players of American football from Pittsburgh
Sportspeople from Wheeling, West Virginia
Players of American football from West Virginia
United States Naval Academy alumni
Washington & Jefferson College alumni
Washington & Jefferson Presidents football players